State Highway 45 (SH-45 or OK-45) is a state highway in Oklahoma.

Route description
SH-45 begins at the US-281/SH-14 junction in Waynoka. The first  of SH-45 heading east out of Waynoka is concurrent with US-281. US-281 then splits off to the north.

 east of Carmen, SH-34 joins SH-8 for a  concurrency to the south, where SH-43 resumes its eastward travel. SH-58 joins SH-43 for a one-mile (1.6 km) concurrency just south of the town of Helena, and at Goltry, SH-45 jogs south a few miles before turning back to the east and heading for a brief concurrency with SH-132 at Carrier. Continuing to the east, SH-45 travels eight more miles (12.9 km) from Carrier, before reaching its terminus at US-60/64/81 at the north edge of Enid.

History
SH-45 was first added to the state highway system between May 1926 and November 1927. The original routing of the highway was from Waynoka to SH-8 in Carmen.

Before 1963, the section of present-day SH-45 between SH-58 and SH-132 was part of the original SH-38. In 1963, all of this SH-38 west of Carrier was renumbered to SH-45 (a north–south section of SH-38 that connected Carrier to US-60 became part of a SH-132 extension). The same year, SH-45 was extended westward to Waynoka. In either 1971 or 1972, the highway was extended eastward to its present terminus on the northern outskirts of Enid. No major changes have occurred since.

Junction list

References

External links

SH-45 at Roadklahoma

045
Transportation in Woods County, Oklahoma
Transportation in Alfalfa County, Oklahoma
Transportation in Garfield County, Oklahoma